YU Yureka is an Android-based cyanogen smartphone produced by YU Televentures , a subsidiary company of Micromax Informatics. It has a caption "Play God". The device was released in January 2015 exclusively on the Amazon India website at a price of INR 8,999. It is the first phone from the Yu brand and offers great specifications at low prices, focusing on the increased customisation options offered by the CyanogenMod operating system that Yu preloads onto its devices. The Yureka (Review) and Yuphoria (Review), Yu's next version, both offer the benefits of customisability and great specifications at competitive prices, and have enjoyed some success. Yureka is a dual SIM phone and it supports Cat4 4G LTE with TDD 2300 MHz and FDD 1800 MHz bands supported for India.

Specifications
Volume rocker button is located on the left side and the power/standby button on the right. The 3.5mm audio-jack is located on top and the micro USB charging and data transfer port is located on the base. There is no Micromax branding on the phone, instead, the YU brand name in a light blue colour is visible on the back.

Hardware

Processor and storage
It's powered by the 64-bit ARMv8 Qualcomm Snapdragon 615(MSM8939) system on chip which houses an octa-core processor and the Adreno 405 GPU clocked at 550 MHz. It comes paired with 2GB of DDR3 RAM and offers 16GB of storage of which 12.8GB is available to the user. The storage is expandable via the microSD card slot by 32GB.

Display
The 5.5-inch(Plus Version) IPS panel display comes with Corning Gorilla Glass 3 protection. The resolution of the display is 1280*720 which accounts to 267 PPI pixel 

density.

Software
It runs on the Cyanogen 11 ROM based on Android KitKat 4.4 which is Upgradable to Cyanogen 12S based on Android 5.0.2 Lollipop. Official Cyanogen 12 ROM based on Android Lollipop 5.0.2 is also released for the Yureka. Official Cyanogen 12.1 OTA update based on Android Lollipop 5.1 was also released for the Yureka in September 2015. Also an incremental update was released in April 2016.
YU has included some of its special apps on the phone such as AudioFX, ScreenCast, Themes and YUniverse.

The Yu Yureka houses a 2500mAh battery.  The phone comes with a 1A charger, so it takes about 2 hours for 0 to 100.

References

Android (operating system) devices
Micromax Mobile
Mobile phones introduced in 2015